870 Naval Air Squadron (870 NAS), also known as VF-870, was a squadron of the Royal Canadian Navy (RCN). It was formed when 803 Naval Air Squadron of the Royal Navy was renumbered to 870 NAS on 1 May 1951. It operated throughout the 1950s and early 1960s before disbanding on 7 September 1962. It was the first RCN squadron to operate jet aircraft.

History
870 Naval Air Squadron was formed on 1 May 1951 when 803 Naval Air Squadron of the Royal Navy's Fleet Air Arm was re-numbered. It was initially based at RCNAS Shearwater, Nova Scotia, with the Squadron operating the Hawker Sea Fury FB.11. In November 1952, 870 NAS adopted an American-styled squadron designation becoming VF-870. On 24 September 1953, the Squadron relocated to RCAF Summerside on Prince Edward Island. VF-870 had its first deployment in January 1954 when it was attached to HMCS Magnificent (CVL 21), it finished its deployment on 9 March. The Squadron stood down for the first time on 30 March.

VF-870 reformed on 1 November 1955, this time equipped with 10 McDonnell F2H-3 Banshees, becoming the first jet squadron in the Royal Canadian Navy. The commanding officer of VF-870 at its reformation was future Canadian Chief of Defence Staff, Lt. Cdr. Robert Hilborn Falls. A total of 39 Banshees were eventually purchased second-hand from the United States Navy (USN) for a cost of $25 million, serving with VF-870, VF-871 and VX-10. VF-870 was attached, along with VF-871, to the aircraft carrier HMCS Bonaventure (CVL 22) – Canada's newest carrier – from which it would deploy. While not deployed, VF-870 was based at RCNAS Shearwater. The Squadron participated in the 1956 Canadian International Air Show in Toronto. The Squadron suffered a loss in August 1957, when a Banshee crashed into a Grumman Avenger AS.3, with one aircraft taking off as the other was landing. VF-870 made their first deployment on 7 September 1957, which lasted until 30 October.

On 16 March 1959, VF-871 amalgamated with VF-870 thus leaving the Squadron as the only RCN unit to operate the Banshee. The Squadron made its final deployment on HMCS Bonaventure on 9 April 1962, lasting until 29 June 1962. While not deployed, VF-870 flew intercepts in the Canadian sector of NORAD. VF-870 disbanded for the last time on 7 September 1962. Throughout its service, the Royal Canadian Navy lost 12 of the 39 Banshees it had purchased, including those of VF-870. A replacement for the Banshee never came to fruition making VF-870 one of only three RCN squadrons to ever operate a jet fighter.

Aircraft operated
Aircraft operated included:
 Hawker Sea Fury FB.11 (1 May 1951–30 Mar 1954)
 McDonnell F2H-3 Banshee (1 Nov 1955–7 Sep 1962)

Commanding officers
Commanding officers included:
 Lieutenant-Commander D. D. Peacocke (May 1951–Feb 1953)
 Lieutenant-Commander D. M. Macleod (Feb 1953–Apr 1954)
 Lieutenant-Commander R. H. Falls (Nov 1955–Dec 1957)
 Lieutenant-Commander W. J. Walton (Jan 1958–Apr 1960)
 Lieutenant-Commander K. S. Nicolson (Apr 1960–Sep 1962)

References

800 series Fleet Air Arm squadrons
History of Canadian military aviation
Military units and formations established in 1951
Military units and formations disestablished in 1954
Military units and formations established in 1955
Military units and formations disestablished in 1962
Naval history of Canada
Royal Canadian Navy
1951 establishments in Canada